Michael Forrest (July 1932 – 21 December 2004) was a Welsh television actor. He appeared in many British television series and films, which include Sir Francis Drake, Z-Cars, Danger Man, The Saint, The Avengers, UFO, Off to Philadelphia in the Morning, The Rivals of Sherlock Holmes, Doomwatch, Who Dares Wins, Armour of God and others.

Acting credits

References

External links

1932 births
2004 deaths
Welsh male television actors